Kamola Riskieva is an Uzbekistani women's football defender.

International goals

See also
List of Uzbekistan women's international footballers

External links 
 

Living people
Women's association football defenders
Uzbekistani women's footballers
Uzbekistan women's international footballers
1992 births
21st-century Uzbekistani women